Control Denied was a progressive metal band formed by death metal musician and Death founder Chuck Schuldiner.

History
The band started in 1996 as Schuldiner wanted to create a more melodic style than was possible with Death. The project was interrupted by Death's release The Sound of Perseverance in 1998, but finally the debut album The Fragile Art of Existence was released in 1999. A second album, tentatively titled When Man and Machine Collide, was partly recorded, but the death of Schuldiner in 2001 put the recordings on hold. Remaining band members had expressed a wish to complete and release the material, though Eric Greif stated that the recordings would not be completed.

Schuldiner had signed with Hammerheart Records for the release of When Man and Machine Collide and recorded music in November 2000 in preparation for it. However, there existed a longstanding legal dispute over the rights of the material with Karmageddon Media, further postponing the completion and release of the album. Part of these incomplete recordings were released without authorization in the Zero Tolerance two-part bootlegs of Schuldiner's B-sides and unreleased tracks. Schuldiner estate lawyer Eric Greif settled all matters with the label by December 2009, allowing for the possibility of completing the album.

On December 4, 2010, vocalist Tim Aymar released a statement saying that plans are being made to record and release the album, stating that Jim Morris of Morrisound Studios (with whom Chuck Schuldiner recorded several albums during his career) had been in contact with Greif to begin planning and booking studio time to record the remaining parts of When Man and Machine Collide. Plans were cut short by a break-in at Morrisound in the spring of 2011 that saw much of their equipment stolen, pushing back the completion of the album. In January 2014, Greif stated that there had been little progress towards the completion of the album other than an exploratory meeting between producer Jim Morris and guitarist Shannon Hamm. By 2016, Greif stated that the album would never be completed.

The Fragile Art of Existence was reissued in October 2010 by Relapse Records in a 2-disc standard format, with one hour of bonus material, and a 3-disc deluxe version, with two hours of bonus material.

Discography 
 1996 demo (1996)
 1996 demo (1997)
 1999 demo (1999)
 The Fragile Art of Existence (1999)
 Unreleased Themes from Control Denied (bootleg) (2004)
 The Fragile Art of Existence (reissue, two formats) (2010)

Members 

Final lineup
 Chuck Schuldiner – guitars (1996–2001), vocals (1996–1997, 1999); died 2001
 Steve Di Giorgio – bass (1999–2001)
 Shannon Hamm – guitars (1996–2001)
 Tim Aymar – vocals (1997–2001); died 2023
 Richard Christy – drums (1997–2001)

Former members
 B.C. Richards – vocals (1996)
 Brian Benson - bass (1997)
 Chris Williams – drums (1996–1997); died 2000
 Scott Clendenin – bass (1996–1997); died 2015

Timeline

References

External links
Death/Control Denied official website
 

Heavy metal musical groups from Florida
Musical groups established in 1996
Musical groups disestablished in 2001